A diary is a form of personal journal.

Diary may also refer to:

Diary types
Diary (stationery), a small book with a space for each day of the year with room for notes
Diary, particular forms are described in Diary#Other forms of diaries
Diary, a particular type of work, such as that described in List of diarists
Diary, or logbook, a record of data relating to a ship or submarine

Arts, entertainment, and media

Films
Diary (1983 film), a 1983 Israeli-British film
Diary (2006 film), a 2006 Cantonese-language thriller film directed by Oxide Pang
The Diary (1974 film), a Yugoslavian cartoon
The Diary (upcoming film), an upcoming Chinese film directed by Jackie Chan

Music

Albums 
Diary (Thelma Aoyama album), 2008
Diary (Sunny Day Real Estate album), 1994
Diary (Shiori Takei album), 2007
Diary (Ralph Towner album), 1973
The Diary (J Dilla album), 2016
The Diary (Scarface album), 1994
The Diary (The Gentle Storm album), 2015
The Diary (You Think You Know), a 2003 unreleased album by Charli Baltimore

Songs 
"Diary" (Charli Baltimore song)
"Diary" (Bread song), 1972
"Diary" (Tino Coury song), 2010
"Diary" (Alicia Keys song), 2003
"Diary", a song by Aya Matsuura from the album T.W.O
"Diary", a song by Wale from the album Attention Deficit
"The Diary" (song), a 1958 song by Neil Sedaka
"The Diary", a song by Funeral for a Friend from the album Tales Don't Tell Themselves
"The Diary", a song by Hollywood Undead from the album Swan Songs

Television
Diary (American TV series), a series on MTV, showing the daily life of an artist
Diary (Maldivian TV series), a 2010 romantic drama television mini-series
Diary, a television ident for BBC Two, see BBC Two '1991–2001' idents
"The Diary" (Adventure Time), a 2015 episode of the animated series Adventure Time

Other uses in arts, entertainment, and media
Diary (novel), a novel by Chuck Palahniuk
El Diario (disambiguation), the name of many Spanish-language newspapers